Popov is a common Russian, Bulgarian and Serbian last name. 

Popov may also refer to:

Places
Popov (crater), a lunar crater
Popov Island, a Russian island in the Sea of Japan
Popov Manor House, a castle in Ukraine
Popov, a village and part of Kostelec (Tachov District) in the Czech Republic
Popov, a village and part of Štítná nad Vláří-Popov in the Czech Republic

Other
Popov (vodka), American brand of vodka
Faddeev–Popov ghost, an object in theoretical physics

See also
Popovo (disambiguation)
Popovka (disambiguation)